Sean Power or Seán Power may refer to:

Seán Power (politician) (born 1960), Irish Fianna Fáil politician, TD for Kildare South
Sean Power (Jersey) (born 1955), Deputy for St Brelade District #2, Jersey
Sean Power (actor), American actor, writer and director
 Sean Power (hurler), Irish hurler